The Clandestine Marriage is a comedy by George Colman the Elder and David Garrick, first performed in 1766 at Drury Lane.  It is both a comedy of manners and a comedy of errors. The idea came from a series of pictures by William Hogarth entitled Marriage à-la-mode.

Plot summary
The plot concerns a merchant, Mr Sterling, who wants to marry off his elder daughter to Sir John Melvil, who is actually in love with her younger sister, Fanny.  Fanny, however, is in love with a humble clerk, Lovewell, whom she has secretly married.  Her attempts to extricate herself from the arrangement with Melvil lead to her becoming the proposed bride of Melvil's elderly uncle, Lord Ogleby.  When the truth comes out, Fanny and Lovewell are forgiven.

Performances

Play and painting
On 12 October 1769 the play was performed as a Royal Command Performance with Sophia Baddeley, Robert Baddeley and Thomas King appearing. These three were recorded acting in an oil painting by Johan Zoffany.

Opera
In 1792, the play was made into an opera: Il matrimonio segreto by Domenico Cimarosa.

Film

In 1999, the play was made into a film directed by Christopher Miles and starred Nigel Hawthorne, Joan Collins, Timothy Spall, Emma Chambers and Tom Hollander.  The screenplay was written by Trevor Bentham.

Notes

External links

 

1766 plays
Plays by George Colman the Elder
Plays by David Garrick